Chandra Tripathi is an Indian politician. She was elected to the Lok Sabha, the lower house of the Parliament of India from Chandauli, Uttar Pradesh in 1984 as a member of the Indian National Congress.

References

External links
 Official biographical sketch in Parliament of India website

India MPs 1984–1989
Indian National Congress politicians from Uttar Pradesh
1931 births
Lok Sabha members from Uttar Pradesh
Living people
Women in Uttar Pradesh politics
20th-century Indian women politicians
20th-century Indian politicians
Politicians from Aligarh
People from Chandauli district